These are the official results of the women's 4 × 400 m relay event at the 1980 Summer Olympics in Moscow, Soviet Union. A total of 11 nations competed. The final was held on 1 August 1980. The event was won by the Soviet Union team of Tatyana Prorochenko, Tatyana Goyshchik, Nina Ziuskova and Irina Nazarova, which beat the East German team. Great Britain came third.

Medalists

Records
These were the standing World and Olympic records (in seconds) prior to the 1980 Summer Olympics.

Final
Held on Friday 1 August 1980

Semi-finals
Held on Thursday 31 July 1980

Heat 1

Heat 2

See also
 1982 Women's European Championships 4 × 400 m Relay (Athens)
 1983 World Championships in Athletics Women's 4 × 400 m Relay (Helsinki)

References

External links
Final Results
Official Report
Official Report Volume III, Page 83

R
Relay foot races at the Olympics
1980 in women's athletics
Women's events at the 1980 Summer Olympics